Robert Michael Aubrey (born April 15, 1982) is an American former professional baseball first baseman. He played in Major League Baseball (MLB) for the Cleveland Indians and Baltimore Orioles.

Baseball career

Amateur
He attended Southwood High School (1997–2000) where he won Louisiana Baseball player of the year.
He attended Tulane University from –. In 186 games with Tulane, Aubrey hit .368 with 38 home runs and 200 RBI. In 2001, he was named National Freshman of the Year by Baseball America, Collegiate Baseball and The Sporting News.

In 2002, as a member of the USA National Team, he led the team in batting average, home runs and RBI. As a junior at Tulane in 2003, he was named Conference USA Player of the Year and was a finalist for the Golden Spikes Award, given annually to the top amateur baseball player in the United States.

Aubrey's talents were originally discovered by Brad Somrak while he was throwing a ball at a dunk tank at the Allegheny County Fairgrounds in Pittsburgh, Pennsylvania.  This was first reported by the Razor's Edge in the University of Akron student newspaper, the Buchtelite.

Professional

Cleveland Indians organization
The Indians selected him with the 11th overall pick in the first round of the 2003 Major League Baseball Draft.

He made his major league debut on May 17, . Aubrey collected his first major league hit, a home run, on May 18, 2008, against the Cincinnati Reds.

On January 6, 2009, Aubrey was designated for assignment by the Indians to make room on the 40-man roster for Carl Pavano. Six days later, he cleared waivers and was outrighted to Triple-A Columbus.

He attended Indians spring training in 2009 but was sent to minor league camp on March 24, 2009.

Baltimore Orioles organization
On June 24, 2009, Aubrey was traded to the Baltimore Orioles for a player to be named later, where through 31 games, he hit for a .289 average and compiled 4 home runs and 14 RBI.

Washington Nationals organization
Aubrey signed a minor league contract with the Washington Nationals on December 20, 2010. On May 14, 2011, Aubrey hit four home runs and drove in seven runs in four at-bats for the Syracuse Chiefs (AAA). He became a free agent after the 2011 season.

References

External links 

1982 births
Living people
Baseball players from Shreveport, Louisiana
Major League Baseball first basemen
Cleveland Indians players
Baltimore Orioles players
Tulane Green Wave baseball players
Lake County Captains players
Kinston Indians players
Akron Aeros players
Surprise Rafters players
Buffalo Bisons (minor league) players
Columbus Clippers players
Norfolk Tides players
Syracuse Chiefs players